Notonomus scotti is a species of ground beetle in the subfamily Pterostichinae. It was described by Sloane in 1907.

References

Notonomus
Beetles described in 1907